The 1922–23 season was Blackpool F.C.'s 22nd season (nineteenth consecutive) in the Football League. They competed in the 22-team Division Two, then the second tier of English football, finishing fifth.

Harry Bedford was the club's top scorer for the second consecutive season, with 32 goals.

Season synopsis
After two opening draws, four consecutive wins kickstarted Blackpool's League campaign. Inconsistency came into play once more, with victories being interspersed with draws and defeats.

Nine wins in the second half of the season assisted in their fifth-placed finish.

The FA Cup saw another first-round exit, this time at Derby County.

Table

Transfers

In

Out

References

Blackpool F.C.
Blackpool F.C. seasons